Hyalinizing clear cell carcinoma (HCCC) is a rare malignant salivary gland tumour, with a good prognosis, that is usually found on the tongue or palate.

Signs and symptoms
HCCCs typically present as a painless mass in the mouth.

Diagnosis
HCCCs are diagnosed by examination of tissue, e.g. a biopsy.

Pathology
HCCC consist of cells with abundant clear cytoplasm, arranged in cords, trabeculae or clusters in a hyalinized stroma. Nuclear pleomorphism is usually minimal and mitoses are infrequently seen.

Owing to their glycogen content, which explains the "clear" appearance under the microscope, tumour cells stain with PAS.  Immunostains for S100 and smooth muscle actin (SMA) are typically negative, but positive for cytokeratins and epithelial membrane antigen (EMA).

HCCCs typically have a recurrent chromosomal translocation, t(12;22), involving the genes EWSR1 and ATF1.  The same translocation is seen in clear cell sarcoma.

The histologic differential diagnosis includes mucoepidermoid carcinoma (clear cell variant), acinic cell carcinoma (clear cell variant), epithelial-myoepithelial carcinoma and metastatic clear cell carcinoma.

Prognosis
They generally have a good prognosis.

See also

References 

Rare cancers
Salivary gland neoplasia